Andy Moor may refer to:

Andy Moor (The Ex) (born 1962), guitarist of The Ex
Andy Moor (musician) (born 1980), producer and DJ

See also
Andrew Moore (disambiguation)
Moor (disambiguation)